The People Under the Stairs is a 1991 American horror comedy film written and directed by Wes Craven and starring Brandon Adams, Everett McGill, Wendy Robie, and A. J. Langer. The plot follows a young boy and two adult robbers who become trapped in a house belonging to a strange couple after breaking in to steal their collection of rare coins.

Craven has stated that The People Under the Stairs was partially inspired by a news story from the late 1970s, in which two burglars broke into a Los Angeles household, inadvertently causing the police to discover two children who had been locked away by their parents. The film was a surprise commercial success, and has been analyzed for its satirical depiction of gentrification, class warfare, and capitalism.

Plot
Poindexter "Fool" Williams is a resident of a Los Angeles ghetto. He and his family are being evicted from their apartment by their landlords the Robesons. The Robesons, who are believed to be a married couple, call themselves Mommy and Daddy. They have a daughter named Alice, to whom they are extremely abusive.

Leroy, his associate Spencer, and Fool break into the Robesons' house by using Spencer to pose as a municipal worker. The Robesons leave the home shortly, but Spencer does not return. Fool and Leroy break into the house to look for Spencer and Fool finds his dead body and a large group of strange, pale children in a locked pen inside a dungeon-like basement.

The Robesons return and Fool flees while Leroy is shot to death by Daddy. Fool runs into another section of the house where he meets Alice. She tells him that the people under the stairs were children who broke the "see/hear/speak no evil" rules of the Robeson household. The children have degenerated into cannibalism to survive and Alice has avoided this fate by obeying the rules without question. A boy named Roach whose tongue was removed as punishment for having called out for help to escape (thus breaking the "speak no evil" rule enforced by Mommy and Daddy) also evades the Robesons by hiding in the walls.

Fool is discovered by Daddy and is thrown to the cannibalistic children to die. However, Roach helps Fool escape, but is critically wounded. As he dies, he gives Fool a small bag of gold coins and a written plea to save Alice. Fool reunites with Alice and the two escape into the passageways between the walls. Daddy releases his Rottweiler dog Prince into the walls to kill them. Fool tricks Daddy into stabbing Prince and he and Alice reach the attic where they find an open window above a pond. Alice is too afraid to jump and Fool is forced to escape without her, but he promises to return for her.

Fool learns that he has enough gold to pay for both his rent and for his mother's surgery. He also finds out that Mommy and Daddy are actually brother and sister, coming from a long line of disturbed, inbred family members. They started out as a family that ran a funeral home, selling cheap coffins for expensive prices, before entering the real estate business, leading them to become greedier and more unhinged. Fool vows to help right the wrong. He reports the Robesons to child welfare and as the police are investigating the house, Fool sneaks back in and reveals to Alice that she is not their daughter; she was stolen from her birth parents, as were all the other children in the basement.

Mommy finds out that Alice knows the truth and believes that Fool has turned her against them, so she attempts to kill Alice. However, the cannibal children charge at Mommy, causing her to flee and run into a knife held by Alice. The children seize her and throw her into the basement, where she lands dead at Daddy's feet. Daddy finds Fool at the vault, where Fool sets off explosives, demolishing the house and causing the money to blow up through the crematorium chimney and into the crowd of people outside. Daddy is killed in the explosion and Alice and Fool reunite in the basement. Meanwhile, the people outside claim the money distributed by the blast, and the freed children venture into the night.

Cast

Production
According to writer-director Craven, the film's story was partially inspired by a real-life news story from 1978. The case involved two African-American burglars who made a forced entry into a house in Los Angeles, California, which unintentionally led to the local law enforcement discovering a pair of children who had been locked away by their parents.

The film was made on a relatively low budget of $6 million, without significant studio interference. The Thomas W. Phillips residence, located at 2215 S. Harvard Blvd in Los Angeles, was used in the film as the house of the Robesons. Everett McGill and Wendy Robie were cast as the Robesons after having starred together as the married couple "Big" Ed and Nadine Hurley in the television series Twin Peaks.

Release

Box office
The film opened at the  spot at the box office, taking in over $5.5 million that weekend, and stayed in the top 10 for a month until early December. The film went on to gross over $24,204,154 domestically (U.S.) and $7,143,000 internationally, bringing its worldwide total to $31,347,154.

Critical reception
 

Marjorie Baumgarten of The Austin Chronicle wrote that "this is the work of the Wes Craven we came to admire". Vincent Canby, writing for The New York Times, described The People Under the Stairs as "an affirmative-action horror film", containing "its share of blood and gore", and lauded the film for being "mostly creepy and, considering the bizarre circumstances, surprisingly funny" in that "it's impossible not to like fiends who, having just dispatched someone in an especially nasty way, can't contain their natural high spirits. They dance."

Chicago-based Siskel & Ebert  had mixed responses to the movie on their TV show. Roger Ebert of The Chicago Sun-Times gave the movie a "thumbs down" review and admitted a distaste for gory horror films but nonetheless gave Craven credit for "creating a distinctive visual world" featuring dark humor and biting social commentary. Gene Siskel of The Chicago Tribune gave The People Under the Stairs a reserved "thumbs up", warning viewers about some disturbing material but also saying "if you like this kind of picture, [Craven] does it as well as you can imagine."

Richard Harrington of The Washington Post criticized Craven's directing, going on to state that "Craven also wrote the script here, based on a news story about California parents who kept their children locked in the basement for many years. That's scary -- and so is how far Craven has fallen." Nigel Floyd of Time Out wrote of the film that "There are a few push-button frights, but a total dearth of mind-disturbing terror; the humour, too, is broad, crowd-pleasing stuff".

S.C. Dacy of Empire gave the film four out of five possible stars and called it "brilliantly deceptive", writing that it is "Not just a disturbing ride but also a hard-hitting political statement". Brent McKnight of PopMatters wrote that the film "is a careful synthesis of genres, steeped in horror, with a satiric bite, and action and thriller traits thrown in just for the hell of it", calling it "easily one of the director's most original, deranged, and off the wall films".

Themes
Noel Murray of The A.V. Club wrote that "footage from the first Gulf War on the Robesons' TV—coupled with the depiction of them as a wealth-hoarding perversion of the typical upstanding suburban couple—marks the movie as a satire", and called the Mommy and Daddy characters a "cartoonish parody of conservatism". S.C. Dacy of Empire referred to the Robesons as a "camouflaged Ronald and Nancy Reagan", and Brett Gallman of ComingSoon.net referred to them as "nightmare versions of Ronald and Nancy Reagan". Jonny Coleman of LA Weekly called the film "a satire of late capitalism, specifically in an L.A. run ragged by the free market of the '80s and the violence it created", noted the comparisons between the Robesons and the Reagans, and compared them to more contemporary figures like Donald Sterling and Donald Trump.

In a 1991 interview with Fangoria, Craven stated that the film "is much closer to The Hills Have Eyes than anything I've done in a long time ... It's a raw film with no dreams in it whatsoever. It's an extraordinary, real situation involving an awful family that shouldn't exist, but unfortunately, often does. In the 2015 Blu-ray commentary track released by Scream Factory, Craven refers to the Robesons' house as representing "the whole society of the United States".

Accolades

Home media
The People Under the Stairs was released on VHS by MCA/Universal Home Video in the spring of 1992, and was later released on DVD in 2003. The film received a Blu-ray release in Region B by Arrow Video on November 4, 2013, featuring a high-definition transfer of the film, an audio commentary by actor Brandon Adams moderated by Calum Waddell, along with various interviews and a theatrical trailer. The film was released in Region A as a Blu-ray Collector's Edition by Scream Factory in 2015, featuring audio commentaries by Wes Craven with Michael Felsher, and by actors Brandon Adams, A. J. Langer, Sean Whalen, and Yan Birch. The Scream Factory release also includes interviews with members of the cast and crew, behind-the-scenes footage, a "making of" featurette, a theatrical trailer, and TV spots.

Remake and possible television series
Craven at one point said he would like to remake the film along with The Last House on the Left and Shocker. However, after the release of the 2009 remake of The Last House on the Left, news of a remake fell dormant until 2015, when it was announced (shortly before Craven's death) that the director was developing a People Under the Stairs TV series for Syfy.

On October 30, 2020, Collider reported that Jordan Peele and Win Rosenfeld signed on to produce a remake under Monkeypaw Productions for Universal Pictures.

Attractions
Universal Studios Florida has incorporated the house of Mommy and Daddy, along with other elements of the film's plot, into a maze attraction in the past for their annual Halloween Horror Nights event. It is also featured on the drive-in movie screen in the Twister...Ride It Out attraction.

References

External links
 
 
 
 

1991 films
1991 horror films
1990s comedy horror films
American comedy horror films
American heist films
American satirical films
Films about cannibalism
1990s English-language films
Films about child abuse
Films directed by Wes Craven
Films set in Los Angeles
Home invasions in film
Incest in film
Universal Pictures films
1991 comedy films
American exploitation films
1990s American films